Boney was a British comic strip that originally appeared in the British magazine Knockout from 1971 to 1973. The strip was printed in the first issue of the magazine from June 12, 1971.

Boney is a skeleton. The strip began with a boy called Billy, who went on an inane ghost train ride at a fair. The ride was so boring that one of the artifacts, Boney, decided to escape with Billy.  The strip records the pair's adventures as they try to stop the owner of the ghost train from recapturing Boney.

Boney joined Whizzer and Chips in 1973 after Knockout merged with it.

References

British comics
1971 comics debuts
Gag-a-day comics
Fictional skeletons
Comics characters introduced in 1971
British comics characters